Barfi! is the soundtrack album for the 2012 Hindi film of the same name. The music and original score is composed by Pritam and featured lyrics written by Swanand Kirkire, Ashish Pandit, Neelesh Misra and Sayeed Quadri. The film is directed by Anurag Basu and produced by Ronnie Screwvala and Siddharth Roy Kapur under UTV Motion Pictures, starring Ranbir Kapoor, Priyanka Chopra, and Ileana D'Cruz in the lead roles. The film marks Pritam's third collaboration with Basu after Gangster (2006) and Life in a... Metro (2007). The album was under-development, when the film was in post-production stage and was completed only by early-August 2012. All the tracks in the film expresses the feelings of Kapoor's character.

The original soundtrack consisted of ten tunes (six original songs and four alternative renditions of the tracks), also including a promotional single which was not included in the film. It was released on 9 August 2012 by the Sony Music label and received highly positive reviews from critics and audiences. Due to its critical and commercial reception, the album was hailed by music critics as "one of the best Bollywood albums of the year and decade". It was a recipient of several awards and nominations, including two Filmfare Awards, four IIFA Awards, three Screen Awards, an Asian Film Award, a Times of India Film Award and a Producers Guild Film Award.

Production 
The soundtrack album consisted of ten tunes – six original songs and four alternative tunes composed for three original tracks: "Ala Barfi", "Aashiyan"  and "Phir Le Aya Dil"; the versions consisted of a reprised, redux and solo rendition. The soundtrack was influenced by Brazilian Bossa nova. One of the lead actors, Priyanka Chopra was supposed to sing a track for the film, but her contract with Universal Music prevented her from taking the offer. The album consisted of minimalistic use of instruments in the songs and score (mostly cellos and violins), due to the setting and treatment of the storyline. The soundtrack was conceptualised, when the film was under post-production stage and was ready by early-August 2012. The film only featured few lip-synced songs as they are placed according to the situation and the characters: Barfi (Ranbir Kapoor) and Jhilmil (Chopra) were deaf and mute.

The titular track "Ala Barfi" is a fun-filled number which explores the theme of the film. Kapoor recommended Mohit Chauhan to sing the title track of the film, after he received praise for the singing in the A. R. Rahman-composition "Sadda Haq" for Rockstar (2011), which was a chartbuster. He further stated that "Mohit babajee (Mohit Chauhan) has sung the title song Ala Barfi and I am very happy. A singer generally doesn't get the credit for the importance he brings to the career of an actor [...]  But if you look at late singers Mohd Rafi, Mukeshji and Kishore Kumar, they used to add a lot to an actor's career."

The ghazal track "Phir Le Aya Dil" consisted of three versions sung individually by Rekha Bhardwaj, Arijit Singh and Shafqat Amanat Ali, based on the moods of the characters. Manish Gaekwad of Scroll.in opined that "The songs are not categorised as happy or sad. Instead, for an age in which songs are remixed, reprised and reduxed, each of the versions has a distinctly new flavour. The ghazal blurs the line between the two polarised states of mind, finding a meeting point to coexist as one. It makes us happy and sad, both at the same time." The musical theme composed for the film, by Pritam, is inspired from the background score from the French film Amélie (2001).

Marketing 
The songs "Ala Barfi", "Main Kya Karoon" and "Kyon" were launched earlier prior to the official album release. On 9 August 2012, UTV Motion Pictures, the film's production company, released the audio under the exclusive license from Sony Music India. The songs were made available to streaming on the digital platforms and were released through audio CDs, few days later. In an attempt to promote the music album, the musical team led by Pritam and the cast and crew, hosted mini-concerts across India. The event that started from 31 August 2012 at Mumbai, continued to be held on Kolkata, Bangalore and Delhi during 1, 3 and 5 September.

The soundtrack album also contains a song titled "Fatafati", sung by Pritam Chakraborty, Arijit Singh and Nakash Aziz. which was not be used in the film, but the song was released as a promotional single on YouTube on 10 September 2012 with a video which contains some behind-the-scenes footage and the additional vocals are sung by Ranbir Kapoor. The song also has some Bengali lyrics written by Amitabh Bhattacharya. News18-based critic had stated that the shooting of "Fatafati" reminds of the viral Tamil song "Why This Kolaveri Di".

Track listing

Release history

Reception

Critical review 
Barfi!s soundtrack received positive reviews by critics. Hindustan Times-based critic rated the album 4.5 out of 5 stars and stated that "the soundtrack is a joyride sans flaws". It further wrote "Pritam has given many hits, but like his tunes in Life in a... Metro, this one will be remembered for breaking the monotony in his sound. There are no foot-tapping numbers or remixes here, but the simplicity that makes this album a winner." Shivi of Koimoi gave the album 4.5 out of 5 stars and stated, "Barfi! is excellent music on all counts. Very rarely does one get to hear an album where you can hear a complete soundtrack without skipping tracks; this is one of them." Joginder Tuteja of Bollywood Hungama rated the album 3.5 out of 5 stars and stated "Barfi!s soundtrack is quite good and is easily one of the best quality creations by Pritam. He has totally reinvented himself with this album which defies Bollywood norms and boasts of a sound of its own. However the biggest challenge lies in the fact that the album has hit the stands really late in the day. What further distinguishes the album from other 'ready to serve' chartbuster scores is the fact that it carries its own distinct (and very good) sound that requires time to grow and register itself with the audience."

Suparna Thombare of Bollywood Life gave 4 out of 5 stars, saying "The music of Barfi! is as sweet as its title and creates a beautiful world of music and poetry that is intrinsic to subject of the film. But its best quality is that it remains simple, innocent and honest, and that's exactly why it touches your soul. That's why it makes your heart sing." Indiatimes-based critic Anand Vaishnav wrote "Like Kapoor's Rockstar, Barfi too is a high-quality album. But while Rockstar's music wowed us with its complexity and layered sound, Barfi's strength lies in its subtlety and simplicity [...] And though initially, the music may come across as a bit inaccessible, in terms of its sound and flavor; every song feels like it's a part of the story." Indiaglitz gave 4 out of 5 stars to the album, saying "Pritam is sure to win awards galore with `Barfi' the combinations are unique and impeccable it's a sure shot winner." Jaspreet Pandohar, in his review for BBC, stated with a verdict: "The creative arrangements and beautiful lyrics make for a standout soundtrack which is an easy listening fit for both world cinema and music-loving audiences". Karthik Srinivasan of Milliblog said "Much like his earlier combo with Anurag Basu in Life in a Metro, Pritam delivers a whopper, again!" Vipin Nair of Music Aloud gave 9/10 to the album saying it as "the best soundtrack of Pritam, who has been in good form this year".

Commercial response 
The commercial response to the album led to feature in several year-end and decade-end lists regarding the "Best Bollywood Albums". In 2017, Film Companion listed the album in the 57th position regarding the Top 100 Bollywood Albums, and also listed in the 6th position, in the 10 Best Hindi Film Albums of the Decade. Akshay Manwani of Firstpost too hailed it as one of the Best Hindi Film Albums of the Decade; calling it as a "delectable treat", he further wrote " Music composer Pritam, though, merits the biggest pat on the back as he imbues every composition in Barfi! with feeling, a quality sorely lacking in so many contemporary film albums". On the special edition released on World Music Day (21 June 2021), Devesh Sharma of Filmfare who wrote for the column, titled "World Music Day Special: Best Bollywood albums of last decade" included Barfi! as one of the list. Tatsam Mukherjee's column for Huffington Post about "Top 20 Bollywood Albums Since 2000" (ranked in non-chronological order) listed the album.

"Main Kya Karoon" was listed in the Top 10 Bollywood Songs of 2012, by The Times of India. "Ala Barfi" was listed in India Today's Chartbusters 2012, where it was featured in one among the 25 Bollywood songs. All the tracks in Barfi! were featured in the Top 100 Bollywood Songs of the Decade by Mumbai Live. "Aashiyan" and "Kyon" from the album, were listed as one among the Best of Hindi Film Music in 2012 (in #2 and #13), by Milliblog, which further included the album in the second-most position. Four of the tracks from the album were featured in Music Aloud Playback – Top 25 of 2012 in Hindi film music. The album in its entirety topped the first position in iTunes upon its release. A report from Ormax Media, had included the album along with Ae Dil Hai Mushkil and Yeh Jawaani Hai Deewani among the Top 10 Best Bollywood Albums of the decade.

Accolades

Notes

References

External links 
 Barfi (soundtrack) at IMDb

2012 soundtrack albums
Hindi film soundtracks
Sony Music India soundtracks
Romance film soundtracks
Comedy film soundtracks
Drama film soundtracks
2010s film soundtrack albums